Brad Day (born 23 September 1994) is a professional rugby league footballer who plays as a  or  for Featherstone Rovers in the Betfred Championship.

Playing career
Day has previously played for the Castleford Tigers (Heritage № 949) in the Super League and the Batley Bulldogs in the Betfred Championship.

Newcastle Thunder
On 25 Oct 2021 it was reported that he had signed for Newcastle Thunder in the RFL Championship

References

1994 births
Living people
Batley Bulldogs players
Castleford Tigers players
English rugby league players
Featherstone Rovers players
Newcastle Thunder players
Rugby league locks
Rugby league second-rows